The Passaic Bus Terminal, also referred to as Main Avenue Terminal,  is a local and regional bus terminal operated by New Jersey Transit (NJT) located on Main Avenue in Passaic, New Jersey in the city's downtown area.

Facilities and service
Unlike its counterpart in Paterson, there are no actual terminal facilities at Passaic Bus Terminal. Instead, there is one turnoff lane on Main Avenue that must be used by all buses entering and departing from the station. In September 2016 it was announced that the antiquated facilities would be replaced with a new off street terminal, made possible in part with federal funding.

Not all bus routes that serve the terminal use it a termination/origination point. Community Coach, under contract with  NJT, operates several routes in Passaic and adjacent Bergen County which run Monday through Saturday service. As of 2016 an average of 2,800 weekday NJT passengers on more than 400 weekday trips used the facility.  It was estimated that there was an average of 1300 weekday passengers on approximately 550 weekday jitney trips.

Passaic bus routes

See also
List of New Jersey Transit bus routes (700–799)
New Jersey Transit Bus Operations

References

External links
Unofficial New Jersey bus map
NJ Transit route finder
NJT services near Passaic Bus Terminal

Transportation buildings and structures in Passaic County, New Jersey
Bus transportation in New Jersey
NJ Transit bus stations
Buildings and structures in Passaic, New Jersey
Transit hubs serving New Jersey